Donald "Don" Fullilove (born May 16, 1958 in Dallas, Texas) is an American actor, who has had a role in numerous projects over the course of his forty-year plus career in both films and television. he currently resides in Burbank California with his wife Tuluv Price Fullilove

Early life
Donald Fullilove graduated from Crenshaw High School in Los Angeles in 1976.

Career
Fullilove began his career as a child actor. His first role was providing the voice of Michael Jackson in the animated ABC-TV Saturday Morning series The Jackson 5ive (1971–73). Fullilove voiced Randy in Kid Power, based on the comic strip Wee Pals by Morrie Turner. The following year, he gave voice to Jason Phillips on Emergency +4, an animated adaptation of Emergency!.

In 1980, Fullilove appeared as Smash in Scared Straight! Another Story. He portrayed Hill Valley, California Mayor Goldie Wilson in the first Back to the Future movie in 1985, and his  hovermobile salesman grandson Goldie Wilson III in Back to the Future Part II (1989).

Fullilove portrayed a train foreman in Spirit: Stallion of the Cimarron (2002). He voiced Nurse George, a character in Pixar's Up (2009).  He appeared in Partysaurus Rex as Chuck E. Duck, a Toy Story short film. Fullilove had a recurring role as Reginald the Koala in American Dad! starting in 2009, though Fullilove was replaced in the role by Erik Durbin in 2010.

Personal life
Fullilove resides in Burbank, California. He is an aircraft pilot.

Filmography

References

External links

Donald Fullilove audio voice resume sample at Voice Chasers

Living people
1958 births
American male film actors
Male actors from Los Angeles
Male actors from Chicago
American male child actors
African-American male actors
American male television actors
21st-century African-American people
20th-century African-American people